Chamaraja Wodeyar V was the eighth maharaja of the Kingdom of Mysore, who reigned only for two years between 1576 after his uncle's death and 1578 until his demise.

Ascension to throne and immediate death 
After his paternal uncle Chamaraja Wodeyar IV's death, Chamaraja Wodeyar V took over, but died in two years' time on the throne. In span of less than a decade, three monarchs had died, his being the most recent. His father died in 1572, later his paternal uncle in 1576, and now himself in 1578. A stable king was necessary for the perpetuity of Mysore Kingdom. These short-span kings and deaths was a repetition of Vijayanaga's past. Further, Vijayanagara Empire was itself in the ruins, rampaged by the Bahamani and Deccan sultans. Sriranga I, during Chamaraja Wodeyar's time, carried the restoration of the Vijayanagara empire, but his reign was marred with repeated attacks and loss of territories from his Muslim neighbours. Now, Chamaraja's death caused more concern among Mysore nobles. Fortunately, his first-cousin, Raja Wodeyar I, who succeeded him, ruled stably.

See also
 Maharaja of Mysore
 Wodeyar dynasty

External links
 Mysore Palace and the Wodeyar Dynasty

Kings of Mysore
Chamaraja V
16th-century Indian monarchs